The 2021 Copa Sudamericana final stages was played from 13 July to 20 November 2021. A total of 16 teams competed in the final stages to decide the champions of the 2021 Copa Sudamericana, with the final played in Montevideo, Uruguay at Estadio Centenario.

Qualified teams
The winners of each of the eight groups in the Copa Sudamericana group stage as well as the third-placed teams of each of the eight groups in the Copa Libertadores group stage advanced to the round of 16.

Copa Sudamericana group stage winners

Copa Libertadores group stage third-placed teams

Seeding

Starting from the round of 16, the teams are seeded according to their results in the group stage, with the Copa Sudamericana group winners (Pot 1) seeded 1–8, and the Copa Libertadores group third-placed teams (Pot 2) seeded 9–16.

Format

Starting from the round of 16, the teams play a single-elimination tournament with the following rules:
In the round of 16, quarter-finals and semi-finals, each tie is played on a home-and-away two-legged basis, with the higher-seeded team hosting the second leg (Regulations Article 2.2.3). If tied on aggregate, the away goals rule will be used. If still tied, extra time will not be played, and a penalty shoot-out will be used to determine the winners (Regulations Article 2.4.4).
The final is played as a single match at a venue pre-selected by CONMEBOL, with the higher-seeded team designated as the "home" team for administrative purposes (Regulations Article 2.2.6). If tied after regulation, 30 minutes of extra time will be played. If still tied after extra time, a penalty shoot-out will be used to determine the winners (Regulations Article 2.4.5).

Draw

The draw for the round of 16 was held on 1 June 2021, 12:00 PYT (UTC−4), at the CONMEBOL Convention Centre in Luque, Paraguay. For the round of 16, the 16 teams were drawn into eight ties (A–H) between a Copa Sudamericana group winner (Pot 1) and a Copa Libertadores group third-placed (Pot 2), with the Copa Sudamericana group winners hosting the second leg. Teams from the same association or the same group could be drawn into the same tie (Regulations Article 2.2.3.2).

Bracket
The bracket starting from the round of 16 is determined as follows:

The bracket was decided based on the round of 16 draw, which was held on 1 June 2021.

Round of 16
The first legs were played on 13–15 July, and the second legs were played on 20–22 July 2021.

|}

Match A

Tied 2–2 on aggregate, Peñarol won on away goals and advanced to the quarter-finals (Match S1).

Match B

Red Bull Bragantino won 3–1 on aggregate and advanced to the quarter-finals (Match S2).

Match C

Santos won 2–1 on aggregate and advanced to the quarter-finals (Match S3).

Match D

Athletico Paranaense won 5–1 on aggregate and advanced to the quarter-finals (Match S4).

Match E

Tied 2–2 on aggregate, LDU Quito won on away goals and advanced to the quarter-finals (Match S4).

Match F

Tied 4–4 on aggregate, Libertad won on away goals and advanced to the quarter-finals (Match S3).

Match G

Rosario Central won 3–2 on aggregate and advanced to the quarter-finals (Match S2).

Match H

Sporting Cristal won 3–2 on aggregate and advanced to the quarter-finals (Match S1).

Quarter-finals
The first legs were played on 10–12 August, and the second legs were played on 17–19 August 2021.

|}

Match S1

Peñarol won 4–1 on aggregate and advanced to the semi-finals (Match F1).

Match S2

Red Bull Bragantino won 5–3 on aggregate and advanced to the semi-finals (Match F2).

Match S3

Tied 2–2 on aggregate, Libertad won on away goals and advanced to the semi-finals (Match F2).

Match S4

Athletico Paranaense won 4–3 on aggregate and advanced to the semi-finals (Match F1).

Semi-finals
The first legs were played on 22 and 23 September, and the second legs were played on 29 and 30 September 2021.

|}

Match F1

Athletico Paranaense won 4–1 on aggregate and advanced to the final.

Match F2

Red Bull Bragantino won 5–1 on aggregate and advanced to the final.

Final

The final was played on 20 November 2021 at Estadio Centenario in Montevideo.

Notes

References

External links
CONMEBOL Sudamericana 2021, CONMEBOL.com

3
July 2021 sports events in South America
August 2021 sports events in South America
September 2021 sports events in South America
November 2021 sports events in South America